Ahamed Aathill Mohamed Samsudeen (1988/1989 – 3 September 2021) was a New Zealand man of Sri Lankan origin. He was responsible for the 2021 Auckland supermarket stabbing, which resulted in the wounding of eight people. Nobody was killed in the attack. Samsudeen, who had a long history of mental health problems and sympathy towards the Islamic State, was shot and killed by the police immediately following the attack.

Early life 
Samsudeen was born in Kattankudy, Sri Lanka, a Muslim-majority town which has had issues with radicalisation in recent years. The youngest child in a family of four children, he received his secondary education at Colombo Hindu College which in Bambalapitiya, Colombo before arriving in New Zealand in 2011 on a student visa.

Refugee applications 
Samsudeen sought refugee status as a Tamil Muslim, alleging that he and his father had issues with Sri Lankan authorities because of their political background. His original claim to refugee status was declined in 2012.

In 2013  the Immigration and Protection Tribunal said that Samsudeen was "persistently re-experiencing traumatic events" and concluded he had a well-founded fear of facing harm if he returned to Sri Lanka. He was subsequently granted refugee status.

His claim to asylum was supported by scars on his body, as well as a psychologist's report which said Samsudeen presented as a "highly distressed and damaged young man" suffering from post-traumatic stress disorder and depression.

While investigating him years later, Immigration NZ was made aware of information that led them to believe his refugee status was fraudulently obtained.

Radicalisation 
According to his mother living in Sri Lanka, Samsudeen was radicalised in New Zealand. She blamed his neighbours from Iraq and Syria for exposing him to radical views. On 23 March 2016, Samsudeen came to the attention of New Zealand police after posting photos of horrific acts of war brutality on his Facebook page, along with remarks praising the Islamic State terrorist strikes in Brussels the day prior.

Criminal activity 
On 29 April and 25 May 2016, police formally warned Samsudeen about posting objectionable material on the web. He apologised and deleted his social media account.

Samsudeen continued to engage in online activities. On 19 May 2017, Samsudeen booked flights for his family to Kuala Lumpur, and for himself to Singapore via Kuala Lumpur. All were for the next day. Police arrested Samsudeen at Auckland Airport on the evening of 20 May. Samsudeen had told a worshipper at an Auckland Mosque he wanted to go to Syria "to fight for ISIS".

After his arrest, police executed a search warrant at Samsudeen's flat. The search found Samsudeen had a large hunting knife under a mattress on the floor, and digital storage media which contained fundamentalist material, including propaganda videos, and photographs of Samsudeen posing with a firearm and digital bookmarks to sales of firearms, crossbows, binoculars, military boots and a vest. He was charged with having these goods, and pleaded guilty to counts of intentionally distributing restricted publications, fraud, and failing to cooperate with authorities in the execution of their search warrants. He was granted bail.

In August 2018, Samsudeen bought a knife while on bail and was arrested again. Another search turned up extremist content, including an Islamic State film showing a masked man slitting a prisoner's throat and wrists in order to kill a "non-believer". He also faced allegations of possessing objectionable material, possessing an offensive weapon, and failing to cooperate with authorities in the exercise of search warrants.

Court cases 
In September 2018, Samsudeen was sentenced to 12 months supervision in relation to the first set of charges, but remained in prison due to additional offences he committed and subsequent charges while on bail.

In July 2020, Samsudeen remained in custody awaiting trial, and the Crown attempted to add an additional charge for the knife and internet posts under the current Terrorism Suppression Act. The High Court denied this, stating that they were bound by law, Justice Downs said it was not for the courts to create such an offence, further saying "The absence of an offence of planning or preparing a terrorist act ... could be an Achilles' heel."

In May 2021, Samsudeen was found guilty in the High Court of possessing undesirable publications, knowing and neglecting to help the police in carrying out their search warrants. He was found not guilty of another charge of having unpleasant material in his possession, as well as the accusation of having a weapon in a public place.

On 6 July 2021, Samsudeen was sentenced to 12 months of supervision by a High Court judge due to the length of time he had previously spent in custody. There were some additional requirements, such as showing his probation officials all of his personal devices and giving them access to his social media accounts. He also had to go through a rehabilitation evaluation and treatment. The Crown wanted him to be monitored by GPS, but that wasn't imposed by the court. He then applied for bail on the charges of assaulting the Corrections officers. A pre-sentence report submitted to the court noted that Samsudeen "had the means and motivation to commit violence in the community" and his risk of reoffending was also considered high. On 16 July 2021, Samsudeen was released on bail by an Auckland District Court judge and was to be monitored by the Special Tactics Group. The Department of Corrections turned down an offer by the New Zealand Muslim Association (NZMA) to help rehabilitate Samsudeen following his release, due to his unwillingness to engage with religious and cultural support. The NZMA expressed concern that Corrections had elected to house Samsudeen at Glen Eden's Masjid e Bilal, whose resources were limited compared to the NZMA.

Supermarket stabbings and death 

Samsudeen travelled by train to LynnMall shopping centre from his home in Glen Eden on 3 September 2021. The Special Tactics Group followed him there but kept their distance due to Samsudeen's paranoia and the social distancing required by the level 4 lockdown in force at the time. Samsudeen entered the Countdown supermarket and was in the store for ten minutes before taking a knife from a shelf and using it to attack eight customers. Within minutes he was shot and killed by the pursuing police officers after he ran at them with his knife raised. Samsudeen was sent to Sri Lanka for burial.

References 

1980s births
2021 deaths
21st-century criminals
Date of birth missing
People from Kattankudy
People from Batticaloa District
People shot dead by law enforcement officers in New Zealand
Refugees in New Zealand
Sri Lankan criminals
Sri Lankan Muslims
Sri Lankan emigrants to New Zealand
Alumni of Colombo Hindu College